Aqqaytym, also known as Akkaytym and Muzdykuduk, (Aqqaitym, اققايتىم; , Akkaytym) is a town in Aktobe Region, west Kazakhstan.

References

Aktobe Region
Cities and towns in Kazakhstan